Sir Carrick Hey Robertson (27 August 1879 – 14 July 1963) was a Scottish-New Zealand surgeon. 

Robertson was born in Glasgow, Lanarkshire, Scotland, in 1879. As surgeon in Waihi and Auckland hospitals, Robertson also served with the New Zealand Medical Corps in World War I. Educated at St Dunstan's College, London, Guy's Hospital and the University of London, he arrived New Zealand in 1906 via Natal, to serve as medical superintendent of Waihi Hospital. He served during the First World War as a temporary major in the New Zealand Medical Corps onboard hospital ship Marama, from 1915 to 1916. A recognised expert in surgery for goitre (then common in New Zealand), he and Dr Casement Aickin performed the first heart operation in New Zealand in 1927 and was a national pioneer of brain surgery.  A prominent surgeon, he was a founding fellow of the Royal Australasian College of Surgeons and honorary fellow of the Association of Surgeons of Great Britain and Ireland.  He was appointed a Knight Bachelor in the 1929 New Year Honours, and awarded the Chevalier of the Légion d'honneur in 1938. He died in Auckland 14 July 1963. He was buried at Purewa Cemetery in the Auckland suburb of Meadowbank.

Honours 
 1924 honorary fellow of the American College of Surgeons
 1929 knighted at an investiture in St James's Palace, London
 founding fellow of the College of Surgeons of Australasia
 1938 he was made a chevalier de la Légion d'honneur
 1947 honorary fellow of the Association of Surgeons of Great Britain and Ireland

References

1879 births
1963 deaths
New Zealand surgeons
Medical doctors from Glasgow
Scottish emigrants to New Zealand
New Zealand military personnel of World War I
Chevaliers of the Légion d'honneur
New Zealand recipients of the Légion d'honneur
New Zealand Knights Bachelor
Burials at Purewa Cemetery